Yüksel Ayaydın is a Turkish retired kickboxer who professionally competed from 2006 until 2018. He is the former WFC European Heavyweight Muaythai Champion, as well as the former WMC World Heavyweight Champion.

Kickboxing career
Yuksel Ayaydin made his professional debut in 2006, during La Grande Sfida sui 4 Angoli, when he faced Tihamer Brunner. He would lose a unanimous decision. He would lose his next bout against Konstantin Gluhov as well.

Following his two debut losses, Ayaydin bounced back with a three fight winning streak, most notably defeating Pierre Celestin Yana. This would be followed by a three fight losing streak.

Ayaydin then amassed a five fight unbeaten streak, with notable wins over Lucian Danilencu and Abdarhmane Coulibaly, which earned him the chance to fight for the FFMDA Heavyweight title. Entering the tournament he won a unanimous decision against Frederic Heine in the semi finals, as well as a unanimous decision over Daniel Lentie to clinch the championship.

After winning his first major honor, Ayadin went on a 4-3 run, with wins over Agron Preteni and Wendell Roche. Entering the Impact Night Heavyweight Tournament, he lost in the first round to Freddy Kemayo.

In 2013 he was scheduled to fight for the WMC heavyweight title against Igor Mihaljević. He won a unanimous decision.

In 2014 he entered the FK ONE Heavyweight Tournamnet, but lost to Freddy Kemayo in the finals.

He had his last professional fight in 2018, losing a unanimous decision to Roman Kryklia during MFC 7.

Ayaydın returned to professional competition on September 22, 2022, as he was booked to face Giuseppe Dominico at MFC 9.

Championships and accomplishments
Fédération française de kick boxing, muay thaï et disciplines associées
FFMDA Heavyweight ChampionshipWorld Fighting ChampionshipsWFC European Heavyweight Muaythai Championship World Muaythai CouncilWMC World Heavyweight Championship

Kickboxing record

|-  bgcolor="#FFBBBB"
| 2018-05-03|| Loss||align=left| Roman Kryklia || MFC 7|| Saint-Priest, France || Decision (Unanimous) || 3 || 3:00|| 23–14–1
|-  bgcolor="#CCFFCC"
| 2017-12-16|| Win||align=left| Mihajlo Kecojević|| La Nuit Des Challenges 17|| Saint-Fons, France || Decision (Unanimous) || 3 || 3:00|| 23–13–1
|-  bgcolor="#CCFFCC"
| 2017-03-09|| Win||align=left| Dragoș Zubco|| MFC 6|| Saint-Priest, France || TKO || 2 || 3:00|| 22–13–1
|-  bgcolor="#CCFFCC"
| 2016-04-30|| Win||align=left| Bangaly Keïta|| MFC 5|| Lons-le-Saunier, France || Decision (Unanimous) || 3 || 3:00|| 21–13–1
|-  bgcolor="#CCFFCC"
| 2016-03-12|| Win||align=left|  Noureddine Tamagroute || Divonne Muay Thai Challenge|| Divonne-les-Bains, France || TKO || 2 || 3:00|| 20–13–1
|-  bgcolor="#FFBBBB"
| 2015-12-11|| Loss||align=left| Yassine Boughanem || Best Of Siam 7|| Paris, France || Decision (Unanimous) || 3 || 3:00|| 19–13–1
|-  bgcolor="#FFBBBB"
| 2015-10-10|| Loss||align=left| Nicolas Wamba || World GBC Tour|| Mazan, France || Decision (Unanimous) || 3 || 3:00|| 19–12–1
|-  bgcolor="#FFBBBB"
| 2015-08-04|| Loss||align=left| Fabrice Aurieng || Fight Night|| Saint-Tropez, France || Decision (Unanimous) || 3 || 3:00|| 19–11–1
|-  bgcolor="#CCFFCC"
| 2015-06-12|| Win||align=left| Daniel Pérez || Strike Fight|| Lyon, France || Decision (Unanimous) || 3 || 3:00|| 19–10–1
|-  bgcolor="#CCFFCC"
| 2015-03-06|| Win||align=left| Thomas Vanneste || Muaythai Fighting Championship|| Saint-Priest, France || Decision (Unanimous) || 3 || 3:00|| 18–10–1
|-  bgcolor="#CCFFCC"
| 2014-06-27|| Win||align=left| Domenico Deserio || Strike Fight|| Lyon, France || TKO || 2 || 3:00|| 17–10–1
|-  bgcolor="#FFBBBB"
| 2014-05-31|| Win||align=left| Freddy Kemayo || FK ONE, Tournament Final || Goussainville, France || Decision (Unanimous) || 3 || 3:00|| 16–10–1
|-
! style=background:white colspan=9 |
|-
|-  bgcolor="#CCFFCC"
| 2014-05-31|| Win||align=left| Gaetan Sautron || FK ONE, Tournament Semifinal || Goussainville, France || Decision (Unanimous) || 3 || 3:00|| 16–9–1
|-
|-  bgcolor="#CCFFCC"
| 2013-09-21|| Win||align=left| Igor Mihaljević || La Nuit Des Challenges 12|| Saint-Fons, France || Decision (Unanimous) || 3 || 3:00|| 15–9–1
|-
! style=background:white colspan=9 |
|-
|-  bgcolor="#CCFFCC"
| 2013-02-22|| Win||align=left| Jono Almond || A1 World Grand Prix 2013|| Flemington, Australia || KO || 4 || 3:00|| 14–9–1
|-  bgcolor="#CCFFCC"
| 2012-09-19|| Win||align=left| Zinedine Hameur-Lain || Thai Fight Lyon|| Lyon, France || Decision (Unanimous) || 3 || 3:00|| 13–9–1
|-  bgcolor="#FFBBBB"
| 2012-04-28|| Loss||align=left| Frank Muñoz || Le Banner Series: acte 1|| Genève, Switzerland || Decision (Unanimous) || 3 || 3:00|| 12–9–1
|-  bgcolor="#FFBBBB"
| 2012-02-25|| Loss||align=left| Raul Cătinaș || SUPERKOMBAT World Grand Prix 2012|| Podgorica, Montenegro || Decision (Unanimous) || 3 || 3:00|| 12–8–1
|-  bgcolor="#FFBBBB"
| 2011-11-26|| Loss||align=left| Freddy Kemayo || Impact Night: Fight Code Final, Tournament Semifinal || Genève, Switzerland || Decision (Unanimous) || 3 || 3:00|| 12–7–1
|-
|-  bgcolor="#CCFFCC"
| 2011-10-22|| Win||align=left| Thomas Kohut || W5 Grand Prix Moscow|| Moscow, Russia || Decision (Unanimous) || 3 || 3:00|| 12–6–1
|-  bgcolor="#CCFFCC"
| 2011-05-14|| Win||align=left| Wendell Roche || It's Showtime 2011 Lyon|| Lyon, France || Decision (Unanimous) || 3 || 3:00|| 11–6–1
|-  bgcolor="#FFBBBB"
| 2011-03-18|| Loss||align=left| Cătălin Moroșanu || SUPERKOMBAT: The Pilot Show|| Râmnicu Vâlcea, Romania || Decision (Unanimous) || 3 || 3:00|| 10–6–1
|-  bgcolor="#CCFFCC"
| 2011-02-05|| Win||align=left| Agron Preteni || Ring Of Honor, NBB2|| Nitra, Slovakia || Decision (Unanimous) || 3 || 3:00|| 10–5–1
|-  bgcolor="#CCFFCC"
| 2011-01-22|| Win||align=left| Daniel Lentie || Championnat du Monde de K1-Rules, Tournament Final || Strasbourg, France || Decision (Unanimous) || 3 || 3:00|| 9–5–1
|-
! style=background:white colspan=9 |
|-
|-  bgcolor="#CCFFCC"
| 2011-01-22|| Win||align=left| Frederic Heine || Championnat du Monde de K1-Rules, Tournament Semifinal || Strasbourg, France || Decision (Unanimous) || 3 || 3:00|| 8–5–1
|-
|-  bgcolor="#CCFFCC"
| 2010-10-15|| Win||align=left| Abdarhmane Coulibaly || Maxi Fight 2|| Saint-Denis, Réunion, France || Decision (Unanimous) || 3 || 3:00|| 7–5–1
|-  bgcolor="#CCFFCC"
| 2010-07-23|| Win||align=left| Alban Galonnier || Le Choc Des Gladiateurs IX|| Le Lavandou, France || Decision (Unanimous) || 3 || 3:00|| 6–5–1
|-  bgcolor="#CCFFCC"
| 2010-06-05|| Win||align=left| Lucian Danilencu || La Nuit Des Challenges 8|| Saint-Fons, France || Decision (Unanimous) || 3 || 3:00|| 5–5–1
|-  bgcolor="#c5d2ea"
| 2010-02-27|| Draw||align=left| Stéphane Susperregui || La Nuit du Muay Thai VII|| Pau, France || Decision (Unanimous) || 3 || 3:00|| 4–5–1
|-  bgcolor="#CCFFCC"
| 2009-07-11|| Win||align=left| ? || Diamond Fight World Tour 2|| Marrakech, Morocco || Decision (Unanimous) || 3 || 3:00|| 4–5
|-  bgcolor="#FFBBBB"
| 2009-04-12|| Loss||align=left| Dževad Poturak || Local Kombat 33|| Oradea, Romania || Decision (Unanimous) || 3 || 3:00|| 3–5
|-  bgcolor="#FFBBBB"
| 2009-01-31|| Loss||align=left| Brice Guidon || La Nuit des Titans : T8 World Final|| Tours, France || Decision (Unanimous) || 3 || 3:00|| 3–4
|-  bgcolor="#FFBBBB"
| 2008-12-20|| Loss||align=left| Lubos Suda || K-1 Fighting Network|| Prague, Czech Republic || Decision (Unanimous) || 3 || 3:00|| 3–3
|-  bgcolor="#CCFFCC"
| 2008-10-25|| Win||align=left| Pierre Celestin Yana || Le Choc des Best Fighters 1|| Asnières-sur-Seine, France || Decision (Unanimous) || 3 || 3:00|| 3–2
|-  bgcolor="#CCFFCC"
| 2008-06-07|| Win||align=left| Sofiane Azi || La Nuit Des Challenges 5|| Saint-Fons, France || Decision (Unanimous) || 3 || 3:00|| 2–2
|-  bgcolor="#CCFFCC"
| 2008-02-16|| Win||align=left| Ben Petit || Tournoi L1 -63,5 kg|| Tournai, Belgium || KO || 3 || 3:00|| 1–2
|-  bgcolor="#FFBBBB"
| 2007-02-16|| Loss||align=left| Konstantin Gluhov || A1 Kickbox|| Turkey || Decision (Unanimous) || 3 || 3:00|| 0–2
|-  bgcolor="#FFBBBB"
| 2006-07-07|| Loss||align=left| Tihamer Brunner || La Grande Sfida sui 4 Angoli|| Riccione, Italy || Decision (Unanimous) || 3 || 3:00|| 0–1
|-
| colspan=9 | Legend''':

See also
List of male kickboxers

References 

1989 births
Living people
SUPERKOMBAT kickboxers
Turkish kickboxers
Turkish male kickboxers